The Pakistan women's national squash team represents Pakistan in international squash competitions, and is administered by the Pakistan Squash Federation. Members of the team compete in singles, doubles and team events at competitions including continental and regional games (Asian and South Asian Games) and continental championships. It has participated in the Asian Squash Team Championships (2004, 2014, 2018); Asian Games (2018); Commonwealth Games (2018) and South Asian Games (2004, 2006, 2016, 2019).

Team Members

Results

Asian Squash Team Championships

Asian Games

Commonwealth Games

South Asian Games

See also 
 Pakistan Squash Federation

References 

Squash teams
Women's national squash teams
Squash
Squash in Pakistan
Women's sport in Pakistan